Magdalena Sadowska (born 26 August 1979 Świdnica) is a Polish volleyball player who played in the Polish Women's Volleyball League.

Playing career 
She participated at the 2001–02 Women's CEV Cup, with Skra Warszawa.

Clubs

References

External links 
http://www.cev.lu/Competition-Area/PlayerDetails.aspx?TeamID=2985&PlayerID=4462&ID=88

1979 births
Living people
Polish women's volleyball players
People from Świdnica